Nehemiah 8 is the eighth chapter of the Book of Nehemiah in the Old Testament of the Christian Bible, or the 18th chapter of the book of Ezra–Nehemiah in the Hebrew Bible, which treats the book of Ezra and the book of Nehemiah as one book. Jewish tradition states that Ezra is the author of Ezra-Nehemiah as well as the Book of Chronicles, but modern scholars generally accept that a compiler from the 5th century BCE (the so-called "Chronicler") is the final author of these books. This chapter and the next focus mainly on Ezra, with this chapter recording Ezra's reading and instructing God's law to the people, then together they celebrated the Feast of Tabernacles with great joy.
Nehemiah the governor is mentioned briefly in verse 9 but Smith-Christopher argues that "the presence of Ezra and the virtual absence of Nehemiah support the argument that chapter 8 is among the displaced chapters from the Ezra material", and suggests that "the original place for [this chapter] would logically have been between Ezra 8 and 9".

Text
The original text of this chapter is in  Hebrew language. This chapter is divided into 18 verses.

Textual witnesses
Some early manuscripts containing the text of this chapter in Hebrew are of the Masoretic Text, which includes Codex Leningradensis (1008).

There is also a translation into Koine Greek known as the Septuagint, made in the last few centuries BCE. Extant ancient manuscripts of the Septuagint version include Codex Vaticanus (B; B; 4th century), Codex Sinaiticus (S; BHK: S; 4th century), and Codex Alexandrinus (A; A; 5th century).

An ancient Greek book called 1 Esdras containing some parts of 2 Chronicles, Ezra and Nehemiah is included in most editions of the Septuagint and is placed before the single book of Ezra–Nehemiah (which is titled in Greek). 1 Esdras 9:37-55 is an equivalent of Nehemiah 7:73-8:12 (The reading of the Law).

Ezra reads the law (8:1–12)
The commission given to Ezra was to 'restructure the Jewish community' under God's laws, so he read and instructed the people who gathered around in 'the commands and intentions of God's revelation'.

Verse 1
And all the people gathered themselves together as one man into the street that was before the water gate; and they spake unto Ezra the scribe to bring the book of the law of Moses, which the Lord had commanded to Israel.
"They spake unto Ezra": the initiative to hear the book of the law of God (Torah) came from the people.
Ezra is described as "the scribe" in this verse and as "the priest" in verse 2. Whereas the King James Version refers to the "street" before the gate, other translations refer to the "square"  or the "courtyard". In the Vulgate the closing words of Nehemiah 7:73, When the seventh month came, the children of Israel were in their cities form the opening words of Nehemiah 8:1: see also  in the Douay–Rheims Bible.

Verse 3
Then he (Ezra) read from it (the Law) in the open square that was in front of the Water Gate from morning until midday, before the men and women and those who could understand; and the ears of all the people were attentive to the Book of the Law.
Ezra's actions recall those of King Josiah in :
The king went up to the house of the Lord with all the men of Judah, and with him all the inhabitants of Jerusalem — the priests and the prophets and all the people, both small and great. And he read in their hearing all the words of the Book of the Covenant which had been found in the house of the Lord.

The feast of Tabernacles (8:13–18)
The requirements of God's laws were founded on God's grace and the intention behind the Feast of Tabernacles was to commemorate God's miraculous deliverance of Israel.

Verse 17
So the whole assembly of those who had returned from the captivity made booths and sat under the booths; for since the days of Joshua the son of Nun until that day the children of Israel had not done so. And there was very great gladness.

"Booths": or "temporary shelters".

See also
Jerusalem
Sukkot
Related Bible parts: Ezra 3, Ezra 7

Notes

References

Sources

Further reading
Blenkinsopp, Joseph, "Ezra-Nehemiah: A Commentary" (Eerdmans, 1988)
Blenkinsopp, Joseph, "Judaism, the first phase" (Eerdmans, 2009)
Coggins, R.J., "The Books of Ezra and Nehemiah" (Cambridge University Press, 1976)
Ecker, Ronald L., "Ezra and Nehemiah", Ecker's Biblical Web Pages, 2007.
Grabbe, L.L., "Ezra-Nehemiah" (Routledge, 1998)
Grabbe, L.L., "A history of the Jews and Judaism in the Second Temple Period, Volume 1" (T&T Clark, 2004)
Throntveit, Mark A. (1992) "Ezra-Nehemiah". John Knox Press
Pakkala, Juha, "Ezra the scribe: the development of Ezra 7–10 and Nehemiah 8" (Walter de Gryter, 2004)

External links
 Jewish translations:
 Nechemiah - Nehemiah - Chapter 8 (Judaica Press) translation [with Rashi's commentary] at Chabad.org
 Christian translations:
 Online Bible at GospelHall.org (ESV, KJV, Darby, American Standard Version, Bible in Basic English)
 Book of Nehemiah Chapter 8. Bible Gateway

08